Simon Kovar (May 15, 1890 – January 17, 1970) was a 20th-century bassoonist and one of the most renowned teachers of the instrument.

Simon Kovar was born Simon Kovarski in Vilnius, Russian Empire, in 1890. He took up the bassoon at age 20 after originally studying the violin.  Kovar came to the United States in June 1922, settling in New York City where he took the position of second bassoonist with the New York Philharmonic. He was highly regarded as a teacher and was head of the bassoon faculty at the Juilliard School of Music for 28 years.  Kovar also taught at Teachers College at Columbia University, the Music Academy of the West, and the Curtis Institute of Music, the Manhattan School of Music, Mannes College of Music, and the Conservatoire de musique du Québec à Montréal.  His students ranged from top orchestra bassoonists, including Sol Schoenbach and Bernard Garfield to jazz musicians, including saxophonists Stan Getz and Ray Pizzi.

His 24 Daily Studies for Bassoon, written in the late 1950s, are considered first-rate practice exercises for the bassoon.

In the 1950s, Kovar moved to Encino, California where he continued teaching almost until the time of his death in 1970 from complications related to emphysema.  He was survived by his wife Rose Kovar and two daughters, Eleanor Imber, also a professional bassoonist, and Leah Herzberg.

References

External links
International Double Reed Society Who's Who
 Obituary in The New York Times, January 19, 1970.
Marvin Roth Bassoonist - Remembrances of Simon Kovar

American classical bassoonists
1890 births
1970 deaths
Lithuanian Jews
Lithuanian emigrants to the United States
Academic staff of the Conservatoire de musique du Québec à Montréal
Deaths from emphysema
American people of Lithuanian-Jewish descent
Jewish American musicians
Juilliard School faculty
Manhattan School of Music faculty
Musicians from Vilnius
20th-century American musicians
20th-century classical musicians
20th-century American Jews